Razian (also Romanized as Rāzīān) is a village in Khezerlu Rural District, in the Central District of Ajab Shir County, East Azerbaijan Province, Iran. At the 2006 census, its population was 990, in 238 families.

References 

Populated places in Ajab Shir County